Cresswell is a village in Northumberland, England.

History
The place-name 'Cresswell' is first attested in the Close Roll for 1234, where it appears as Kereswell. It appears as Cressewell in 1242 in the Book of Fees. The name means 'stream where water cress grew'. Between 1875 and 1944, Cresswell village had a lifeboat. The lifeboat crews were successful in saving 91 lives, and the lifeboat station still stands.
 
During the Second World War, the Royal Air Force operated two radar sites south of the village on the road to Lynemouth. Both sites have since been cleared and have no above ground evidence of previous activity.

The village has one ice cream shop which closes out of season, and a café on the beach just to the north of the village, open year-round. The village also has two caravan holiday home parks – Cresswell Towers and Golden Sands. Cresswell Towers takes its name from the old pele tower nearby, Cresswell Tower, and is owned by Parkdean Resorts.

At the 2001 Census, the village had a population of 237, which by the 2011 Census, had dropped to 206.

Landmarks 
Embedded in the small cliffs of Snab Point are the remnants of fossilised trees. The beach area is littered with the remnants of fossilised wood and small seams of coal can be seen in the cliffs. Depending on the tides and wind, vast swathes of sea coal is washed up within the bay.

Music
Cresswell was the inspiration for 'Tidelines' by UK composer Peter McGarr a piece written for Gamelan at Fenham House.

References

External links

 Cresswell Towers Caravan Park
 Cresswell House B&B
 Golden Sands Holiday Park

Villages in Northumberland
Populated coastal places in Northumberland